Hans Laine (25 April 1945 – 30 May 1970) was a Finnish auto racer who was killed on the Nürburgring during training sessions.

Hans Laine's career as an athlete was a legacy of his father, Holger Laine, who was the driving force behind the Eläintarhan ajot motor racing competition, both on and off the track. Holger Laine worked as a car dealer in Ruskeasuo, Helsinki.

Hans Laine started his racing career as a rally driver. He began to gain international reputation when he and his uncle Henry participated in the Acropolis Rally in 1967, where he ranked seventh. In the 1969 Jyväskylä Grand Rally, he was in the lead, with Hannu Mikkola being second, before retiring with gearbox issues. In the same year, Laine participated in a sports car race for the first time at the Nürburgring with a Porsche 906, together with Sten Axelsson of Sweden.

In 1970, Laine joined the AAW racing team, owned by Antti Aarnio-Wihuri, for which a Porsche 908/02 sports car was purchased. Laine's partner was Gijs van Lennep of The Netherlands. At the start of the season, they achieved success in the UK at the BOAC 500 in Brands Hatch under difficult conditions. Their successful season continued in the Italian Targa Florio, where they finished fourth with the Porsche 908.

The AAW team announced two cars for the Nürburgring ADAC 1000 km race: a Porsche 917, driven by Pauli Toivonen and Sten Axelsson, and a Porsche 908/02 driven by Hans Laine and Gijs van Lennep. In qualifying, the pair attained a time of 8 minutes and 14 seconds, which would have justified a starting position of eighth. During free practices, however, on the Dottinger Höhe straight, Laine's car lost downforce when going over a bump, causing it to crash and catch fire. Despite the efforts of rescuers and other competitors, the fire was not put out in time and Laine died from his injuries.

Hans Laine had become a favorite of the people and his death was a shock to the public as well as to his rivals. Laine's funeral was held at Espoo Cathedral. His coffin was carried by Holger and Henry Laine, and, among others, Timo Mäkinen, Hannu Mikkola and Gijs van Lennep.

Racing results in track competitions

Racing results in rally competitions

Further reading 
Complete results of Hans Laine

References 

Finnish rally drivers
Finnish racing drivers
1945 births
1970 deaths
Sportspeople from Helsinki